Kiran Singh (1947-2005) was a Bollywood film producer and story writer.  She was one of the founders/partners of Shiv Bhakti Films, a company predominantly involved with the production of Indian films.  After the Shiv Bhakti Films banner was retired in the early 1990s, Kiran Singh continued her film production activities with Shree Shiv Bhakti Films.

Family background
Kiran was raised in the Bollywood film industry and stayed affiliated to this industry throughout her life.  Kiran's father and his five brothers founded Varma Films, known for box-office hits like Suhaag Raat (1948), Patanga (1949) and Badal (1951).  Suhaag Raat was the seventh highest-grossing film of 1948; Patanga was the seventh highest-grossing film of 1949; and finally, 
Badal  was the eighth highest-grossing film of 1951. One of Kiran's uncles, Munshiram Varma, was the producer of four films : Suhaag Raat, Thes (1949), Neki Aur Badi (1949) and Aurat (1953).  Another uncle, Bhagwandas Varma, was producer of Badal and Baghi Sipahi (1958) as well as the director of three films: Aurat, Pooja (1954) and Baghi Sipahi. Other relatives in the Indian Film industry include Aroon Varma, Kiran's brother, who was the producer for the film Balidaan (1971).   Also, Sheena Varma, Kiran's niece, is married to Zulfi Syed, a film and TV actor.

Kiran was married to Indian actor and producer Sujit Kumar soon after she got her undergraduate degree and remained married to him from 1970 until her death in 2005. Sujit's death trailed Kiran's death by about five years.  Their son, Jatin Kumar, continued their legacy in the film industry when he became the co-producer of the film Aetbaar.

Film career
In the early 1980s Kiran Singh commenced her film career with her spouse Sujit Kumar when they jointly founded Shiv Bhakti Films.  The company debuted in film production through the 1984 Bhojpuri film Paan Khaye Saiyan Hamaar, directed by Sujit Kumar and also starring Sujit in the lead role. The film's story was written by Kiran and marked her debut as a story writer in the Indian film industry.

The company's second project was Anubhav which was released in 1986. Once again Sujit played an important acting role in the film, but this time it was a character role.  The leading roles in the film were performed by Shekhar Suman, Padmini Kolhapure and Richa Sharma. The film marked the first Hindi-language film made by Shiv Bhakti Films.  It also marked the introduction of Kiran Singh as a producer together with Sujit Kumar. In 2015, almost 19 years after it was released, Anubhav was included in the list of Bollywood's five best sex comedies by the Daily News & Analysis (DNA), a newspaper affiliated with Zee News.

Both of the above two films, Paan Khaye Saiyan Hamaar and Anubhav, were low-budget films that did well at the box-office.  Subsequently, Shiv Bhaki Films started making films with higher budgets and more star power. Asmaan Se Ooncha (1989) featured well-known stars like Jeetendra, Raj Babbar, Anita Raj and Govinda. Also, renowned stars like Anil Kapoor, Madhuri Dixit,  Anupam Kher and Mala Sinha played the lead in Khel (1992). Khel was the nineteenth highest-grossing film of 1992. For his role in Khel, Anupam Kher got the Filmfare Award for Best Comedian.  Like Anubhav,  both Asmaan Se Ooncha, and Khel were produced by Kiran together with her spouse Sujit.

When the Shiv Bhakti Films banner was retired in the early 1990s, Kiran and Sujit started a new company called Shree Shiv Bhakti Films.  The first film made under this banner was Daraar (1996) starring Juhi Chawla, Rishi Kapoor and Arbaaz Khan. For her role as an abused wife, Juhi Chawla was nominated for the Filmfare Award for Best Actress and for his role as the abusive husband, Arbaaz Khan, in his debut performance, received the Filmfare Best Villain Award.

The second film made under the Shree Shiv Bhakti Films banner was Champion (2000).  It starred Sunny Deol, Manisha Koirala and Rahul Dev. Champion received four awards, all for Rahul Dev’s performance in his debut, yet breakthrough role in a Hindi-language film.  Specifically, Rahul was nominated for: the Screen Award for Best Actor in a Negative Role, the  Screen Award for Most Promising Newcomer Actor- Male, the  Filmfare Award for the Best Performance by an Actor in a Negative Role and Rahul was the winner of the Award of the  International Indian Film Academy Award for Best Male Debut.

Finally, for the film Aetbaar, produced initially by Shree Shiv Bhakti Films, an impressive ensemble was assembled, including megastar Amitabh Bacchan. However, the production of the film stalled because of financial challenges faced by Kiran and her spouse, Sujit.  When the Tata Group decided to enter the film production business, Aetbaar  was rescued by this group. Cutting Edge Entertainment, a new division set up by Tata Group, became the new production company of Aetbaar with Jatin Kumar, son of Kiran and Sujit, being a co-producer. Aetbaar was, however, not commercially successful. 

Kiran died a year after the release of Aitbaar in 2004 and Sujit died a few years later in 2010. Subsequently, their son Jatin Kumar announced that he would revive their original banner, Shiv Bhakti Films, with the production of Bhojpuri- and Hindi-language films.

Filmography

References

External links 
 

1947 births
2005 deaths
Hindi film producers
Indian women screenwriters
Indian women film producers